The Prix Émile-Nelligan is a literary award given annually by the Fondation Émile-Nelligan to a North American French language poet under the age of 35. It was named in honour of the Quebec poet Émile Nelligan and was first awarded in 1979, the 100th anniversary of his birth.

Recipients
 1979 - François Charron, Blessures
 1980 - Claude Beausoleil, Au milieu du corps l’attraction s’insinue (poèmes 1975–1980)
 1981 - Jean-Yves Collette, La Mort d’André Breton
 1982 - Jocelyne Felx, Orpailleuse / Philippe Haeck - La Parole verte
 1983 - Lucien Francœur, Les Rockeurs sanctifiés
 1984 - Normand de Bellefeuille, Le Livre du devoir
 1985 - Anne-Marie Alonzo, Bleus de mine
 1986 - Carole David, Terroristes d’amour / France Mongeau - Lumières
 1987 - Michael Delisle, Fontainebleau / Élise Turcotte - La voix de Carla
 1988 - Renaud Longchamps, Légendes suivi de Sommation sur l’histoire 
 1989 - Élise Turcotte, La Terre est ici
 1990 - Claude Paré, Chemins de sel
 1991 - Rachel Leclerc, Les Vies frontalières
 1992 - Serge Patrice Thibodeau, Le Cycle de Prague
 1993 - Martin-Pierre Tremblay, Le Plus Petit Désert
 1994 - Monique Deland, Géants dans l’île
 1995 - Marlène Belley, Les jours sont trop longs pour se mentir
 1996 - Carle Coppens, Poèmes contre la montre
 1997 - Patrick Lafontaine, L’Ambition du vide
 1998 - Tony Tremblay, Rue Pétrole-Océan
 1999 - Jean-Éric Riopel, Papillons réfractaires
 2000 - Tania Langlais, Douze bêtes aux chemises de l'homme
 2001 - Mathieu Boily, Le grand respir
 2002 - Benoît Jutras, Nous serons sans voix
 2003 - Jean-Simon DesRochers, Parle seul
 2004 - Kim Doré, Le rayonnement des corps noirs
 2005 - Renée Gagnon, Des fois que je tombe
 2006 - Maude Smith Gagnon, Une tonne d'air
 2007 - Danny Plourde, calme aurore (s'unir ailleurs, du napalm plein l'œil)
 2008 - Catherine Lalonde, Corps étranger
 2009 - François Turcot, Cette maison n'est pas la mienne
 2010 - Philippe More, Le laboratoire des anges
 2011 - Mahigan Lepage, Relief
 2012 - Mario Brassard, Le livre clairière
 2013 - Michaël Trahan, Nœud coulant
 2014 - Roxanne Desjardins, Ciseaux
 2015 - Rosalie Lessard, L'observatoire
 2016 - Jonathan Lamy, La vie sauve
 2017 - François Guerrette, Constellation des grands brûlés
 2018 - Jonathan Charette, Ravissement à perpétuité
 2019 - Laurence Veilleux, Elle des chambres

References 

Canadian poetry awards
Awards established in 1979
1979 establishments in Canada
Quebec awards
French-language literary awards
Literary awards honouring young writers